A special operating agency is a designation given to a government organization within a department or agency of the Government of Canada that has some management flexibility, independence, and separate accountability. They function, without legislation, within a framework agreement approved by their given department's deputy minister, the minister responsible for the agency, and the Treasury Board. They are considered part of the host department and not separate legal entities.

Current special operating agencies

Former special operating agencies 
 Consulting and Audit Canada Revolving Fund (Public Services and Procurement)
Passport Canada (Global Affairs)
Physical Resources Bureau (Global Affairs)

References 

Federal departments and agencies of Canada